Claudio Risi (12 November 1948 – 26 April 2020) was an Italian film director. His father Dino and his brother Marco are also film directors.

Selected filmography

References

External links 

1948 births
2020 deaths
Italian film directors
People from Bern